is the third album by Kaku P-Model.

Overview
Based on a concept, divorced from the story built upon in previous Kaku P-Model albums, centered on changing away from stagnating customs so that humans stop being "limited editions" of themselves, Kai=Kai presents modern electronic music mixed in with prominent guitar playing, where Susumu Hirasawa adopts tones that harken back to his roots in surf music.

The production of the album marked the first time Kaku P-Model material was created to be used as soundtrack music: Hirasawa has affirmed that a movie adaptation of the Satoshi Kon manga Opus will feature music by him, with the song of the same name to serve that purpose.

Track listing

Personnel
Susumu Hirasawa - Vocals, All instruments, Programming, Production
Masanori Chinzei - Mixing, Mastering
Syotaro Takami, Grae - Translation
Toshifumi Nakai - Design
Presented by Chaos Union/TESLAKITE: Rihito Yumoto, Mika Hirano, Kinuko Mochizuki, Yukino Hinata

Chart performance

References

External links
official webpage

Susumu Hirasawa albums
2018 albums